Governor Bennett may refer to:

Benjamin Bennett (governor) (16??–17??), Governor of Bermuda
Caleb P. Bennett (1758–1836), 29th Governor of Delaware
John O. Bennett (born 1948), Acting Governor of New Jersey, 2002
Richard Bennett (governor) (1609–1675), Governor of the Colony of Virginia from 1652 to 1655
Robert Frederick Bennett (1927–2000), 39th Governor of Kansas
Thomas Bennett Jr. (1781–1865), 48th Governor of South Carolina
Thomas W. Bennett (territorial governor) (1831–1893), 5th Governor of Idaho Territory